Cataluña (F73) is the third ship of five Spanish-built s, based on the American  design, of the Spanish Navy.

Laid down on August 1970 and launched on 3 November 1971, Cataluña was commissioned into service on 16 January 1975.

All of these Spanish frigates were built to the size of the Knox frigates.

Other units of class 
 
 
 
 

Ships of the Spanish Navy
1971 ships
Baleares-class frigates
Frigates of the Cold War